The List of Italian-language television channels includes the following channels:

Italy

Other countries

See also 
 Lists of television channels
 List of Italian-language radio stations

Lists of television channels by language
Channels
Channels

it:Elenco dei servizi televisivi ricevibili in Italia
nl:Lijst van televisiekanalen in Italië